Andrew and Jon Erwin, known as the Erwin Brothers, are American Christian film directors, screenwriters and film producers known for such films as Woodlawn, October Baby, Moms' Night Out and I Can Only Imagine which have collectively grossed more than $150 million worldwide. They are the leaders and co-founders of the production company Kingdom Story Company.

Early life
The Erwin brothers were born in Birmingham, Alabama. They are the children of former state senator Hank Erwin and grandsons of Henry Eugene "Red" Erwin Sr., a Medal of Honor recipient and World War II veteran.

Career
After stopping their studies at a film school, the Erwin brothers produced The Cross and the Towers, a documentary about the steel cross found in the debris of the World Trade Center towers after September 11 attacks.

Jon Erwin served as second unit director for Alex and Stephen Kendrick's 2011 film Courageous. When asked by Alex in reference to his career, "[w]hat is your purpose?", Jon and Andrew conceived the idea for their first feature film, October Baby, a Christian anti-abortion drama which was released in March 2014. The brothers went on to produce and direct several other faith-based films, including comedy Moms' Night Out (2014), and sports drama Woodlawn (2015). Their 2018 music biopic I Can Only Imagine, became a surprise box-office hit with $17.1 million from 1,629 theaters during its debut weekend, and went on to become the most successful independent film of the year of 2018, as well as the third-highest grossing music biopic at the time of its release. It made more in box office receipts than all of their previous films combined and is their most successful film to date, with $86 million in worldwide box office against a production budget of $7 million.

In 2018, the brothers and their frequent filmmaking collaborator Kevin Downes announced the formation of Kingdom Story Company, a production company specializing in Christian films that will be distributed through Lionsgate. Some will be directed by the Erwins, while other movies will use newcomers and other veteran directors. Jon Erwin compared it to a "Christian Pixar" or "Christian Marvel". As Baptist Press put it, the company will specialize "in a specific area"—the faith-based genre—and be able to "work on multiple films at one time."

In early 2019, the Erwins revealed that their fifth film, I Still Believe, would be focusing on the life story of Christian musician Jeremy Camp. It was released on March 13, 2020.

In February 2020, Andrew Erwin related the Erwins' goal in filmmaking:

In 2021, they released The Jesus Music, a documentary about contemporary Christian music. They also released American Underdog, a biopic about NFL quarterback Kurt Warner. The film drew $27 million at the box office and was positively reviewed by critics.

Filmography

Jon Erwin

Andrew Erwin

References

External links
 

American film directors
Living people
American screenwriters
Christian artists
American film producers
Sibling filmmakers
American Christians
1978 births
1982 births